In computer programming, a window class is fundamental to the Microsoft Windows (Win16, Win32, and Win64) operating systems and its Application Programming Interface (API).

The structure provides a template from which windows may be created by specifying a window's icons, menu, background color and a few other features. It also holds a pointer to a procedure that controls how the window behaves in response to user interaction. It finally tells the operating system how much additional storage space is needed for the class and each window created from it.

There have been two versions of window classes; the only non-technical addition brought by the second one is that of a small additional icon for the window. The first version was present in the Windows 3.x series; the second version appeared in Windows 95 and Windows NT 3.1.

References

External links
A manual page for window class on Microsoft's website
About Window Classes

Microsoft application programming interfaces